SPOC most often refers to Space Operations Command, a field command of the United States Space Force.

SPOC may also refer to:

Government, business, and organizations 
 Sex Professionals of Canada, a sex workers' rights group based in Toronto
 St Peter's Old Collegians Football Club, South Australian Amateur Football League
 Spaceflight Processing Operations Center, a building near launch pads 40 and 41 at Cape Canaveral Air Force Station

Paralympics 
 Seoul Paralympic Organizing Committee, host committee for the 1988 Summer Paralympics
 Sydney Paralympic Organising Committee, host committee for the 2000 Summer Paralympics

Other uses 
 Small private online course, a version of a MOOC (Massive Open Online Course) used locally with on-campus students
 Single point of contact, see Point of contact
 Single Point of Control, a common safety paradigm in industrial automation; see

See also 
 SPC (disambiguation)
 SPO (disambiguation)